Réka Pecz (born June 21, 1992) is a Hungarian swimmer, who specialized in breaststroke events. Pecz represented her nation Hungary at the 2008 Summer Olympics, and also trained as a member of the swimming team at Jövő Sports Club in Miskolc, under the tutelage of personal coach Balázs Fehérvári.

Pecz competed for Hungary in the women's 100 m breaststroke at the 2008 Summer Olympics in Beijing, Leading up to the Games, she posted a time of 1:11.15 to clear the FINA B-standard (1:11.43) by 0.28 of a second at the Hungarian Junior Championships in Eger. Swimming on the outside lane in heat three, Pecz opened up the race with a spectacular second-place feat, but faded down the stretch to hit the wall with a seventh-place time in 1:12.17. Pecz, however, failed to advance to the semifinals, as she placed forty-first out of 49 swimmers in the prelims.

References

External links
NBC 2008 Olympics profile

1992 births
Living people
Olympic swimmers of Hungary
Swimmers at the 2008 Summer Olympics
Hungarian female breaststroke swimmers
Swimmers from Budapest
20th-century Hungarian women
21st-century Hungarian women